The Fyssen Foundation (French: Fondation Fyssen) is a French charitable organization that was established and endowed in 1979 by H. Fyssen. The aim of the foundation is to stimulate research into the processes underlying and leading to cognition, including work in  such disciplines as ethology, paleontology, archaeology, anthropology, psychology, logic, and neuroscience. To this end, the foundation offers postdoctoral stipends to French scientists wanting to do research abroad and foreign scientists wishing to work in a French laboratory. Reports on this research are published in the foundation's journal, the Annales de la Fondation Fyssen. It also offers research grants. In addition, the foundation regularly organizes symposia and supports the publication of the proceedings thereof. Finally, the foundation yearly awards an International Scientific Prize. The topics of this prize rotate among the different fields of interest to the foundation.

The foundation annually offers postdoctoral fellowships to young foreign researchers wishing to work in a French laboratory as well as to young French researchers wishing to work in a foreign laboratory.

References

External links 
 

Charities based in France
Foundations based in France
Scientific research foundations
Organizations established in 1979
1979 establishments in France